Cangyuan Va Autonomous County is under the administration of Lincang City, in the southwest of Yunnan province, China. Wa/Va people are the main inhabitants here. Wa language is common here. Cangyuan Washan Airport is located in the county.

Administrative divisions
Cangyuan Va Autonomous County has 4 towns, 5 townships and 1 ethnic township. 
4 towns

5 townships

1 ethnic township
 Mengjiao Dai Yi and Lahu

Climate

References

External links
Cangyuan County Official Site

 
County-level divisions of Lincang
Wa autonomous counties